The Penske PC-24 was an open-wheel CART racing car that competed in the 1995 IndyCar season with Marlboro Team Penske and Hogan Penske Racing. It was designed by Nigel Bennett. It scored a total of 5 wins that season; 4 wins for Al Unser Jr., and 1 win for Emerson Fittipaldi.

References